Hagen Peak is a  double summit mountain located on the western boundary of Yoho National Park in the Canadian Rockies of British Columbia, Canada. The mountain was named after Canadian Army Private Alfred G. Hagen of Field, BC, who was serving with the 10th Canadian Infantry Brigade when he was killed in 1944 World War II action, during the liberation of Calais, France. The mountain's name was officially adopted July 5, 1961, when approved by the Geographical Names Board of Canada.


Climate
Based on the Köppen climate classification, Hagen Peak is located in a subarctic climate with cold, snowy winters, and mild summers. Temperatures can drop below −20 °C with wind chill factors below −30 °C. Precipitation runoff from the mountain drains west into the Blaeberry River, or east into headwaters of the Amiskwi River.

See also
Geology of the Rocky Mountains
Geography of British Columbia

References

External links
 Weather: Hagen Peak

Two-thousanders of British Columbia
Canadian Rockies
Columbia Country
Mountains of Yoho National Park
Kootenay Land District